Litthabitella is a genus of very small freshwater snails with a gill and an operculum,  aquatic gastropod mollusks in the family Hydrobiidae.

Species
Species within the genus Litthabitella include:
 Litthabitella elliptica

References

 Nomenclator Zoologicus info

 
Hydrobiidae
Taxonomy articles created by Polbot